Labeo simpsoni is a species of freshwater cyprinid fish in the genus Labeo. It is found only in Africa: in the middle and upper parts of the Congo River.

References 

Labeo
Fish described in 1943
Taxa named by Kate Bertram
Cyprinid fish of Africa